Chris Rumph (born December 21, 1971) is an American football coach who is currently the defensive line coach for the Minnesota Vikings of the National Football League. He most recently served as the defensive line coach for the Chicago Bears of the National Football League. He previously coached at the collegiate level for over 15 years.

Playing career 
At the University of South Carolina, Rumph played on the defensive side at linebacker for South Carolina under head coaches Sparky Woods and Brad Scott.

Coaching career

Early coaching career 
After a spring as a graduate assistant at his college alma mater,  Rumph, would go on to be the head coach at his former high school for five years,  After a one-year stint with South Carolina State coaching defensive backs and  three years coaching outside linebackers  at Memphis, Rumph joined  Clemson’s staff and remained there for five seasons.

Alabama
From there, Rumph moved to Alabama  to replace  Bo Davis. There, he won back-to-back BCS national championships as the team’s defensive line coach.

Texas
Rumph spent the 2014 season at Texas as the team’s assistant head coach for defense/defensive line.

Florida
Rumph joined the Gators’ staff as a defensive line coach in 2015 and was promoted to co-defensive coordinator prior to the 2017 season. He served as Florida's full-time defensive coordinator for the final four games of the season after Randy Shannon was promoted to interim head coach when Jim McElwain was fired.

Tennessee
Rumph worked as the defensive coordinator for Tennessee in 2018 and 2019.

Houston Texans
Rumph then made the jump to the NFL and worked as the team’s outside linebackers coach for the 2020 season.

Chicago Bears
In 2021, Rumph became the defensive line coach for the Chicago Bears. He was not retained by the team following the firing of head coach Matt Nagy after the conclusion of the 2021 season.

Minnesota Vikings
In 2022, Rumph became the defensive line coach for the Minnesota Vikings under head coach Kevin O'Connell.

Personal life 
Rumph and his wife, Kila, are parents of two sons. He also has a daughter from before marriage. One son, Chris Rumph II played college football at Duke and was drafted by the Los Angeles Chargers with the 13th pick in Round 4 (118th overall) of the 2021 draft.

References

Living people
1971 births
African-American coaches of American football
African-American players of American football
Alabama Crimson Tide football coaches
Chicago Bears coaches
Clemson Tigers football coaches
Florida Gators football coaches
High school football coaches in South Carolina
Houston Texans coaches
Memphis Tigers football coaches
South Carolina Gamecocks football players
South Carolina Gamecocks football coaches
South Carolina State Bulldogs football coaches
Sportspeople from South Carolina
Tennessee Volunteers football coaches
Texas Longhorns football coaches
21st-century African-American sportspeople
20th-century African-American sportspeople
Minnesota Vikings coaches